John Garry Hemingway (10 May 1933 – 13 June 2002) was an English rugby union, and professional rugby league footballer who played in the 1950s and 1960s.

Background
Garry Hemingway was born in Thorne, Doncaster, West Riding of Yorkshire, England, he was a pupil at Thorne Grammar School, he was the English Schools' Athletics Championships long jump champion two years in succession, in 1951 and 1952, he undertook his national service (extended to 3-years) in the Royal Air Force from 1950 to 1953, including at RAF Cosford, Shropshire, he became a Physical Training Instructor (PTI), in 1954 he worked as a temporary (unqualified) teacher at Thorne Secondary Modern School (for boys), and the Stainforth Secondary Modern School (for boys), in 1955 he began a 3-year Diploma of Education (Teacher Training) course at Cheltenham Training College at Francis Close Hall, St. Pauls, Cheltenham (now a campus of the University of Gloucestershire), where he was the college rugby union team's top try-scorer, after 2-years he left the college with Certificate of Education, to pursue a professional rugby league career with Leeds, he became a French language and physical education teacher at Kirkstall County Secondary School in Leeds from the 1950s to the 1980s where he taught, amongst others, the future rugby league footballer; John Holmes, in the late-1960s he coached Yorkshire Schoolboys rugby league team with George Cranage (of Cross Green Secondary Modern School), he retired to near Grange-over-Sands close to the Lake District with his wife Shirley, he died aged 69 in Barrow-in-Furness, Cumbria, his funeral took place in Barrow-in-Furness, Cumbria, England.

Playing career

Club career
Garry Hemingway played in Old Thornensians RUFC's victory in the Yorkshire Shield during the 1951-52 season, he set Old Thornensians RUFC's "most tries scored in a season" record with 30 tries, later extended by his older brother Tom Hemingway with 31 tries, he transferred from rugby union to rugby league during September 1957, he made his début for Leeds against Salford on Saturday 5 October 1957. In the 1959-60 season a knee ligament injury ruled him out for nearly two years, he returned for the 1961-62 season, he scored a try in the pre-1962-63 season Lazenby Cup match against Hunslet on Monday 13 August 1962, but following re-occurrence of the knee injury during the match, he subsequently retired from rugby league.

County honours
Garry Hemingway represented Yorkshire against Ulster during 1954, and represented Sheffield and South Yorkshire against Derbyshire during 1950.

County Cup Final appearances
Garry Hemingway played , i.e. number 2, and scored two tries in Leeds' 24-20 victory over Wakefield Trinity in the 1958–59 Yorkshire County Cup Final during the 1958–59 season at Odsal Stadium, Bradford on Saturday 18 October 1958, and played , and scored a try in the 9-19 defeat by Wakefield Trinity in the 1961–62 Yorkshire County Cup Final during the 1961–62 season at Odsal Stadium, Bradford on Saturday 11 November 1961.

Genealogical information
Garry Hemingway was the son of Arthur Hemingway and Ethel (née Lifsey), and the younger brother of Tom D. Hemingway (birth registered fourth ¼ 1929 in Thorne district – died  (aged 80–81), and holder of Old Thornensians RUFC's "most tries scored in a season" record with 31 tries). Garry Hemingway's marriage to Shirley P. (née Wheatley, and a primary school teacher) took place on Saturday 5 April 1958, and was registered during second ¼ 1958 in Don Valley district, West Riding of Yorkshire, England. They had children; Sally A. Hemingway (born , birth registered during second ¼ 1959 in Wharfedale district), Jonathan G. Hemingway (born , birth registered during first ¼ 1961 in Leeds district), and Elaine M. Hemingway (born , birth registered during second ¼ 1963 in Leeds district).

References

External links
Search for "Hemingway" at rugbyleagueproject.org
Search for "Hemmingway" at rugbyleagueproject.org

Search for "Gary Hemingway" at britishnewspaperarchive.co.uk
Search for "Gary Hemmingway" at britishnewspaperarchive.co.uk
Search for "Garry Hemingway" at britishnewspaperarchive.co.uk
Search for "Garry Hemmingway" at britishnewspaperarchive.co.uk

1933 births
2002 deaths
English rugby union players
English rugby league players
Leeds Rhinos players
People from Thorne, South Yorkshire
Rugby league players from Doncaster
Rugby league wingers
Rugby union players from Doncaster
Rugby union wings
Yorkshire County RFU players